Lazzaro Uzielli (4 February 1861 − 8 October 1943) was an Italian pianist and music educator.

Life 
Born in Florence, Uzielli studied in his home town with Luigi Vannuccini und Giuseppe Buonamici, then with Ernst Rudorff in Berlin, and with Clara Schumann and Joachim Raff at Dr. Hoch's Konservatorium in Frankfurt.

From 1883 to 1907 he worked as a teacher at Dr. Hoch's, and then followed a call to the Hochschule für Musik Köln. In his long years as a teacher he had numerous students who became important pianists. He undertook numerous concert tours through Germany, Austria, Switzerland, Italy and the Netherlands.

Uzielli died in Bonn aged 82.

Well-known students 
Uziello's students included:
 Fritz Busch
 Hubert Giesen
 Alfred Hoehn
 Hans Knappertsbusch
 Karl Hermann Pillney
 Cyril Scott
 Bernhard Sekles
 William Steinberg
 Eduard Zuckmayer

Literature 
  (ed.): Kurzbiographien zur Geschichte der Juden 1918–1945. Edited by Leo Baeck Institute, Jerusalem. Saur, Munich 1988, .
 Zvi Asaria (ed. and Rabbiner der Synagogengemeinde Köln): Die Juden in Köln. Von den ältesten Zeiten bis zur Gegenwart. Verlag J. P. Bachem, Cologne 1959.

References

External links 
 
 

Italian classical pianists
male classical pianists
Italian music educators
Academic staff of the Hochschule für Musik und Tanz Köln
1861 births
1943 deaths
Musicians from Florence